Resident Alien is a 1990 documentary film about the life of British writer and actor Quentin Crisp. directed, produced and edited by Jonathan Nossiter, and co-produced by Dean Silvers. Resident Alien was Crisp's first documentary; it was followed by Naked in New York in 1994 and The Celluloid Closet in 1995.

It was premiered at Berlin Panorama (part of Berlin International Film Festival) in 1991.

Synopsis
At age 72, writer and melancholy master of the bon mot, Quentin Crisp (1908–1999), became an Englishman in New York. John Foster's camera follows Crisp about the streets of Manhattan, where Crisp seems very much at home, wearing eye shadow, appearing on a makeshift stage, making and repeating wry observations, talking to John Hurt (who played Crisp in the autobiographical TV movie The Naked Civil Servant), and dining with friends. Others who know Crisp comment on him, on his life as an openly gay man with an effeminate manner, and on his place in the history of gays' social struggle. The portrait that emerges is one of wit and of suffering.

Cast
 Quentin Crisp as himself
 Sting as himself - Singer
 John Hurt as himself - Actor
 Holly Woodlawn as herself - Performer/Actor
 Fran Lebowitz as herself - Writer
 Michael Musto as himself - Gossip Columnist

Reviews
Christopher Null for rated the movie 2.5 stars out of 5 and "Ok". He stated that the "film that is ostensibly about why a strange little man decides to uproot his life and move" to New York, but it provides no answers.

"Savagely amusing and warm." The Washington Post.

"Perceptive and thoroughly engaging." The LA Times.

Home media
The DVD release of the film appeared on 27 September 2005 for Region 1. A new DVD edition was re-released in the US in 2006 by New Video.

References

External links
 

1990 films
1990 documentary films
1990 LGBT-related films
Documentary films about LGBT topics
American LGBT-related films
Documentary films about New York City
Historiography of LGBT in New York City
Films directed by Jonathan Nossiter
Films set in Manhattan
1990s English-language films
1990s American films